Jonas & François (Jonas Euvremer, François Rousselet), born in 1982, is a French directing team of music videos and commercials. They are signed to Division Paris for global rep.

Videography 

2006
Kavinsky - "Testarossa Autodrive"
2007
Justice - "D.A.N.C.E."
Kanye West featuring T-Pain - "Good Life"
2008
Flairs - "Better than Prince"
The Presets - "Talk Like That"
Madonna featuring Justin Timberlake and Timbaland - "4 Minutes"
2009
Sébastien Tellier - "Kilometer"
Depeche Mode - "Peace"
Mr Hudson featuring Kanye West - "Supernova"
Muse - "Undisclosed Desires"
2010
Audio Bullys - "Only Man"
White Lies - "Bigger than Us"
2012
Labrinth - "Express Yourself"
2013
Electric Guest - "The Bait"
Iggy Azalea - "Work"
DJ Fresh vs. Diplo featuring Dominique Young Unique - "Earthquake"
Iggy Azalea featuring T.I. - "Change Your Life"
2014
Jack White - "Lazaretto"
BBC Music - "God Only Knows"
2015
Snoop Dogg featuring Charlie Wilson - "So Many Pros"

2017
Liam Gallagher - "Wall of Glass"

Music Video Awards / Nominations
D.A.N.C.E., Justice
MTV Europe Music Awards 2007 | Video Star

MTV Video Music Awards Japan 2008 | (Nomination) Best Dance Video
The Good Life, Kanye West feat. T-Pain
MTV Video Music Awards 2008 | Best Special Effects

BET Hip Hop Awards 2008 | Video Of The Year
4 Minutes, Madonna feat. Justin Timberlake & Timbaland
MTV Europe Music Awards 2008 | (Nomination) Video Star
Only Man, Audio Bullys
UK Video Music Awards 2010 | Best Visual Effects

D&AD 2011 | Silver Pencil Animation & Special Effects
Work, Iggy Azalea
MTV Video Music Awards 2013 | (Nomination) Artist To Watch
UK Video Music Awards 2013 | (Nomination) Best Urban Video
UK Video Music Awards 2013 | (Nomination) Best Styling In A Video
World Music Awards 2014 | (Nomination) World's Best Video 
Change Your Life, Iggy Azalea
World Music Awards 2014 | (Nomination) World's Best Video 
UK Video Music Awards 2014 | (Nomination) Best Urban Video
Lazaretto, Jack White
UK Video Music Awards 2014 | (Nomination) Best Rock Video

References

External links 
Jonas & Francois - Division Paris 
Jonas & Francois - Myspace
Jonas & Francois - Facebook
Jonas & Francois - Showreel
Jonas & Francois: All music videos chronologically ordered.

1982 births
Living people
French music video directors